Phiditia lucernaria is a moth in the family Phiditiidae. It was described by Francis Walker in 1866. It is found in Costa Rica.

References

Bombycoidea